Tomáš Tomek (born 10 July 1988) is a Slovak professional ice hockey goaltender. He is currently a free agent.

Career
Tomek previously played for HC Nové Zámky, HK Skalica, ŠHK 37 Piešťany and HKM Zvolen. He also played for MsHK Žilina. He also played for the Orli Znojmo of the EBEL during the 2014–15 season.

Career statistics

Regular season and playoffs

References

External links

 

1988 births
Living people
HK 91 Senica players
HC Nové Zámky players
HK 36 Skalica players
ŠHK 37 Piešťany players
Orli Znojmo players
SC Riessersee players
MsHK Žilina players
HKM Zvolen players
HK Dukla Michalovce players
HK Poprad players
Slovak ice hockey goaltenders
Sportspeople from Skalica
Slovak expatriate ice hockey players in Germany
Slovak expatriate ice hockey players in the Czech Republic